Dina Gusovsky is an American journalist and writer for Late Night with Seth Meyers. She has worked previously for Bloomberg News and CNN. In 2015 Gusovsky received an award for Excellence in Television at the 2015 Walter Cronkite Awards.

Gusovsky received political asylum in the United States in 1991, leaving Russia to avoid rampant discrimination against Jewish people.

References

External links
Official website

CNBC people
Year of birth missing (living people)
Place of birth missing (living people)
American women journalists
Living people
21st-century American women
American people of Russian-Jewish descent